Mark Thomas Gilboyne (October 28, 1924 – May 5, 2010), nom de guerre Gil Boyne, was an American pioneer in modern hypnotherapy.

In addition to his own practice, his main focus was on the training of "lay" hypnotherapists in Glendale, California; and, over some 55 years, he trained thousands of hypnotherapists globally with his Transforming Therapy methods. Many of his students wrote  books and created their own hypnotherapy training centers.

Mentored by Ormond McGill — with whom he collaborated for Professional Stage Hypnotism (1977) — he championed the accessibility of hypnotherapy and consistently fought against legislative efforts worldwide to restrict hypnosis to the purely medical professions, which had largely ignored the therapeutic value of hypnosis until Boyne, Milton Erickson, and Dave Elman.

Early life and career
Mark Thomas Gilboyne was born in Philadelphia, Pennsylvania on October 28, 1924, to Mark Gilboyne (1903-1976) and Margaret Elizabeth Gilboyne (1908-1983), née Barratt. He had one sister, Margaret Dolores Gilboyne (1933-2005).

Raised in a deeply religious Irish-American Catholic family, his early schooling was religiously focused; something that influenced his spiritual beliefs throughout his life.

He served in the Navy in the Pacific theater during World War II, after which he was assigned to a therapeutic program based on psychoanalysis.

The program was largely ineffective, and his frustration with the approach, his spiritual and religious upbringing, and experience as a stage hypnotist led him to develop the transformative approach using hypnosis. Contemporary influences included Dave Elman, Milton Erickson, Fritz Perls' Gestalt Therapy and Carl Rogers' "unconditional positive regard".

Hypnotism Training Institute

Gil founded and was the director of the Hypnotism Training Institute in Glendale. In 1976, he opened Hypnotherapy training center in the United States offering up to 250 hours of training, including a diploma-offering curriculum in professional hypnotherapy.

Transforming Therapy
With his background and experiences and with influences by his contemporaries mentioned above, Boyne developed one of the first programs designed to train hypnotherapists in a regression-based approach. The resulting program, Transforming Therapy, was used for decades to train over 12,000 and possibly as many as 15,000 hypnotherapists globally. The Transforming Therapy method incorporated aspects of Regression Therapy and Gestalt Therapy as well as focusing on the self-healing power of the subconscious mind. It uses a compassionate spiritual approach that simplifies theory in the actual therapy and hones in on allowing the inner mind to construct its own solutions creatively. The approach is generally considered to be rapidly effective[3].

Boyne continued to train hypnotherapists for over 55 years, continuing to evolve many novel techniques in the field and imparting them to his students.

Boyne founded Westwood Publishing, one of the first publishers to focus on hypnotherapy-focused publications.

Boyne also founded the American Council of Hypnotist Examiners in 1980.

Hypnotherapist to the Stars
From his Glendale offices near Hollywood, Gil worked with many actors throughout his career, including Sylvester Stallone, Lily Tomlin, and Dolly Parton. Such work often brought international media attention. He was also a technical director or advisor on several films and television series, including The Hypnotic Eye, Above and Beyond, and The Eleventh Hour.

In addition, Boyne reportedly worked with professional and olympic athletes and the US Green Berets.

Awards and honors

1981: Honorary Doctor of Humane Letters, Newport University, Newport Beach, California
1982: Honorary Doctor of Humane Letters, University for Humanistic Studies, San Diego, California
1990: Lifetime Achievement Award, American Council of Hypnotist Examiners.
1992: Honorary Doctor of Philosophy, Transpersonal Psychology, Westbrook University, New Mexico
1992: American Eagle Leadership Award, American Council of Hypnotist Examiners
1996: One of Glendale's 100 Most Influential Citizens (Glendale News Press, Feb. 28)
1997: Honorary Life Member, New Zealand Hypnotherapists Association
1997: Fellowship award for Distinguished Service, Australian Academy of Hypnotic Science
1998: Post Graduate Diploma of Psychotherapy, Australian College of Clinical Hypnotherapy
2000: Inducted, International Hypnosis Hall of Fame, Valley Forge, PA.
2000: "MAN OF THE CENTURY", International Hypnosis Hall of Fame, Valley Forge, Pennsylvania.
2000: Fellowship, National Council for Hypnotherapy (UK)
2001: Fellowship Award for Exceptional Service, Korean Hypnotherapy Associates
2003: Lifetime Achievement Award, Royal Hong Kong Hypnotherapy Association
2007: Honorary Doctor of Religious Education, Lordland University, Bakersfield, California

Professional Positions

Director, Self Help Institute, 674 Crenshaw Blvd., Los Angeles, California WE5-9234
Director, Hypnotism Training Institute of Los Angeles
Founder and CEO, Westwood Publishing Company
Founder and Director, Hypnotherapy Counseling Center
Co-Founder, British Council of Hypnotist Examiners
Executive Director, American Council of Hypnotist Examiners

Bibliography

 Boyne, Gil, Transforming Therapy a New Approach to Hypnotherapy (August 1989) 
 Boyne, Gil, How to Teach Self-hypnosis (1987) 
 Boyne, Gil, "Success Programming For the Hypnotherapist" (June 1, 2007) 
 Boyne, Gil, Hypnotherapy and Healing: The Mental, Emotional, and Spiritual Aspects of Healing and Pain Control (1988) 
 Boyne, Gil, "Marketing Self-Hypnosis and Other Group Programs"  (1988) 
 Boyne, Gil, Hypnosis: New Tool in Nursing Practice (1982) 
 McGill, Ormond, Boyne, Gil, Professional Stage Hypnotism (1977)

Footnotes

External links
Gil Boyne Online
Obituary
Gil Boyne.com
Westwood Publishing
Hypnotherapy Training Institute
American Council of Hypnotist Examiners

1924 births
2010 deaths
American hypnotists
American male non-fiction writers
American non-fiction writers
American spiritual mediums
United States Navy personnel of World War II